Moriarty is a town in Torrance County, New Mexico, United States. The population was 1,910 at the 2010 Census. It is part of the Albuquerque Metropolitan Statistical Area.

Moriarty is about ten miles east of Edgewood, New Mexico, and shares a school district with the town, despite them being in separate counties (Edgewood is in Santa Fe County).

Geography
Moriarty is located at  (34.999815, -106.046667).

Climate

Culture 

Every October, Moriarty plays host to the Pinto Bean Fiesta, which is composed of a bunch of simple games in Crossly Park, as well as a parade and crowning of a "Pinto Bean Queen."

The Albuquerque Soaring Club (ASC), established in 1960 in Albuquerque, New Mexico, is currently headquartered at the Moriarty Municipal Airport. Moriarty boasts some of the finest year round soaring conditions in the United States, including 15 knot thermals to 22,000 ft, mountain wave to 34,000 ft, and orographic lift off the Manzano, Sandia, Ortiz, and Sangre de Cristo mountain ranges. Many flights in excess of 300 miles are recorded each year. Many pilots have achieved all of their soaring diamonds out of Moriarty. Moriarty airport is also home to the United States Southwest Soaring Museum, and has a commercial glider operation, Sundance Aviation.

Moriarty also serves as a fireworks Mecca for the Albuquerque metropolitan area with two year around stores as well as at least two other large tents which set up for the sixteen-day selling period allowed by New Mexico State Law from June 20 to July 6. Vendors sell both Black Cat and TNT brand fireworks. All vendors are located along old Route 66 and competition is always fierce. Almost all Class C fireworks are allowed for sale and use in Moriarty including firecrackers, mortars, Roman candles, and cakes up to 500 grams (the maximum allowance), and though pop rockets have been banned throughout New Mexico for the last three years, larger stick rockets are still allowed.

Moriarty is named after the first permanent settler in the town, Michael Timothy Moriarty.

Demographics

As of the census of 2000, there were 1,765 people, 668 households, and 478 families residing in the city. The population density was 368.2 people per square mile (142.3/km2). There were 775 housing units at an average density of 161.7 per square mile (62.5/km2). The racial makeup of the city was 73.54% White, 0.62% African American, 2.49% Native American, 0.28% Asian, 0.06% Pacific Islander, 18.75% from other races, and 4.25% from two or more races. Hispanic or Latino of any race were 40.79% of the population.

There were 668 households, out of which 41.6% had children under the age of 18 living with them, 47.5% were married couples living together, 19.9% had a female householder with no husband present, and 28.3% were non-families. 24.3% of all households were made up of individuals, and 9.1% had someone living alone who was 65 years of age or older. The average household size was 2.64 and the average family size was 3.12.

In the city, 33.6% of the population was under the age of 18, 7.4% from 18 to 24, 28.3% from 25 to 44, 20.0% from 45 to 64, and 10.8% who were 65 years of age or older. The median age was 32 years. For every 100 females, there were 86.2 males. For every 100 females age 18 and over, there were 85.2 males.

The median income for a household in the city was $25,150, and the median income for a family was $31,957. Males had a median income of $24,345 versus $20,000 for females. The per capita income for the city was $13,640. About 13.3% of families and 18.0% of the population were below the poverty line, including 21.8% of those under age 18 and 18.3% of those age 65 or over.

Notable people
 Toney Anaya – Governor of New Mexico from 1983 to 1987; born in Moriarty
 Kyle Blanks – professional baseball player with the San Diego Padres
 John Dodson – mixed martial artist
 Matt Moore – professional baseball player with the Tampa Bay Rays
 Tim Means – mixed martial artist

References

External links

 City of Moriarty, New Mexico
 

Cities in New Mexico
Cities in Torrance County, New Mexico
Albuquerque metropolitan area